Carenum coracinum is a species of ground beetle in the subfamily Scaritinae, found in Australia. It was described by William John Macleay in 1865.

References

coracinum
Beetles described in 1865